Octopus is the seventh full-length studio album recorded by the British synthpop band The Human League. It was produced by the former Tears for Fears keyboard player Ian Stanley and released by EastWest Records in 1995. It was the first new album from The Human League in five years after the termination of their long-term contract with Virgin Records. Octopus was the first Human League album that presented the band as a trio consisting of the singers Philip Oakey, Joanne Catherall and Susan Ann Sulley. The former Human League member Jo Callis and keyboard player Neil Sutton also contributed to the writing of the album.

The album's sound is notable for almost exclusively featuring analogue synthesizers, a marked change from the band's primarily "digital" sound in the mid-to-late 1980s.

Background
The album saw a return to the public eye for the band, who had been out of the top ten since their 1986 album Crash. Band members Catherall and Sulley admitted that Octopus is "probably our last shot at the big time." Oakey described the album as the band returning to its synthesizer roots, saying: "We went in some silly directions after Dare, trying to bring in acoustic instruments and trying to make white soul music. Now we've gone back to how we started, singing over recorded sequences on synthesizers."

Release
Contrasting the failure of previous album Romantic?, Octopus was a commercial success. The first single, "Tell Me When", received support from MTV in the UK and the U.S. and the song became the band's first top-ten hit in nine years, peaking at number six in the UK Singles Chart. The single also climbed to number thirty-one in the U.S. Billboard Hot 100. The Octopus album also peaked at number six in the UK, becoming the Human League's sixth top-ten album. It was later certified gold by the British Phonographic Industry for sales of over 100,000 copies.

The album was released in the US on Elektra Records on 25 April 1995.

The album's second single "One Man in My Heart", a ballad sung by Sulley, also reached the UK top-twenty and the third single from the album, "Filling Up with Heaven", was also a UK Top 40 hit.

Although the album sold well and renewed interest in the band, EastWest Records went through a complete change in management and decided to cancel the band's contract as well as those of other established artists. It was another six years before the band released a new album on new label Papillon Records.

Track listing

Chart performance

References 

1995 albums
The Human League albums
Albums produced by Ian Stanley
East West Records albums